Allen Cothrel Winsor (born September 9, 1976) is a United States district judge of the United States District Court for the Northern District of Florida.

Biography 

Winsor received a Bachelor of Business Administration from Auburn University, and a Juris Doctor from the Fredric G. Levin College of Law where he was inducted into the Order of the Coif and served as editor-in-chief of the Florida Law Review. After law school, Winsor served as a law clerk to Judge Edward Earl Carnes of the United States Court of Appeals for the Eleventh Circuit. From 2003 to 2005, he was an associate at King & Spalding. He later was a partner in the Tallahassee office of GrayRobinson, where he focused on civil and appellate litigation. He then joined the Florida Attorney General's office and served for 3 years as Solicitor General of Florida, under Pam Bondi. In 2016, Governor Rick Scott appointed him to the Florida First District Court of Appeal, where he served until being appointed to the district court.

Federal judicial service 

On April 10, 2018, President Donald Trump nominated Winsor to serve as a United States District Judge of the United States District Court for the Northern District of Florida. He was nominated to the seat vacated by Judge Robert Lewis Hinkle, who assumed senior status on November 7, 2016. On May 23, 2018, a hearing on his nomination was held before the Senate Judiciary Committee. On June 14, 2018, his nomination was reported out of committee by an 11–10 vote.

On January 3, 2019, his nomination was returned to the President under Rule XXXI, Paragraph 6 of the United States Senate. On January 23, 2019, President Trump announced his intent to renominate Winsor for a federal judgeship. His nomination was sent to the Senate later that day. On February 7, 2019, his nomination was reported out of committee by a 12–10 vote. On June 18, 2019, the Senate invoked cloture on his nomination by a 54–42 vote. On June 19, 2019, he was confirmed by a 54–44 vote, with Democrat Joe Manchin voting for him. He received his judicial commission on June 21, 2019.

Memberships 

He has been a member of the Federalist Society since 2005.

References

External links 
 
 Appearances at the U.S. Supreme Court from the Oyez Project
 

1976 births
Living people
21st-century American lawyers
21st-century American judges
Auburn University alumni
Federalist Society members
Florida lawyers
Florida Republicans
Florida State University faculty
Fredric G. Levin College of Law alumni
Judges of the Florida District Courts of Appeal
Judges of the United States District Court for the Northern District of Florida
People from Orlando, Florida
Solicitors General of Florida
United States district court judges appointed by Donald Trump